Prairie schooner may refer to:
 Covered wagon used by pioneers in the American old west
Prairie Schooner, a magazine published by the University of Nebraska-Lincoln
Prairie Schooner Book Prize
Prairie Schooners, a 1940 American western film directed by Sam Nelson

See also

Conestoga wagon